Rawalakot Hawks is a Pakistani professional T20 franchise cricket team competes in the Kashmir Premier League. They are captained by Ahmed Shehzad and coached by Arshad Khan. The franchise represents Rawalakot, the capital of Poonch district.

History

2021 season 

They finished 1st in the group stage, winning 3 and losing 1 and having 1 end in no result. They lost to Muzaffarabad Tigers in the qualifier but qualified for the final after defeating Mirpur Royals in eliminator 2. The team won the inaugural edition of the Kashmir Premier League after beating Muzaffarabad in the final.

2022 season 

On 14 July 2022, Mohammad Amir was announced as Rawalakot’s icon player. Ahmed Shehzad was named as Rawalakot’s captain.

Team identity

Current squad

Captains

Coaches

Result summary

Overall result in KPL

Head-to-head record

Source: , Last updated: 31 January 2022

Statistics

Most runs 

Source: , Last updated: 22 August 2022

Most wickets 

Source: , Last Updated: 23 August 2022

References

Kashmir Premier League (Pakistan)

External links

Cricket teams in Pakistan